The second Drakeford government is the Labour-led government formed after the 2021 Senedd Election on 6 May 2021, with Mark Drakeford re-appointed as First Minister without opposition on 12 May 2021.

Appointment 
On 12 May 2021, Mark Drakeford was the only person nominated for the position (by Rebecca Evans), and was subsequently recommended by the Presiding Officer to be appointed as First Minister.

Cabinet

Deputy ministers

See also 

 Shadow Cabinet (Wales)
 Members of the 6th Senedd
 2021 Senedd election

References 

Ministries of Elizabeth II
Ministries of Charles III
Welsh governments
Cabinets established in 2021
2021 establishments in Wales
Drakeford